Jason Tesson (born 9 January 1998) is a French cyclist, who currently rides for UCI ProTeam .

He had his first professional victory in 2021, when he won stage 2 of the Tour Poitou-Charentes en Nouvelle-Aquitaine in a sprint ahead of Elia Viviani.

Major results

2019
 2nd Grand Prix de la ville de Pérenchies
2020
 1st  Road race, National Amateur Road Championships
 4th Paris–Tours Espoirs
 6th Road race, UEC European Under-23 Road Championships
 7th Grand Prix de la Ville de Lillers
2021
 1st  Overall À travers les Hauts-de-France
1st Stage 1
 1st Stage 2 Tour Poitou-Charentes en Nouvelle-Aquitaine
 2nd Grand Prix de la Somme
 3rd Route Adélie
 4th Grand Prix du Morbihan
 6th Grand Prix de la ville de Pérenchies
 6th Paris–Chauny
 8th Grand Prix de Fourmies
 8th Paris–Bourges
2022
 Four Days of Dunkirk
1st  Points classification
1st Stage 2
 1st Stage 1 Boucles de la Mayenne
 3rd Overall Ronde de l'Oise
1st  Points classification
1st Stages 3 & 4
 3rd Grand Prix de la Ville de Lillers
 3rd Paris–Chauny
 4th Cholet-Pays de la Loire
 5th Grand Prix de Fourmies
2023
 La Tropicale Amissa Bongo
1st Stages 2 & 3
 8th Clásica de Almería

References

External links

1998 births
Living people
French male cyclists
Sportspeople from Angers
Cyclists from Pays de la Loire